The International Union of History and Philosophy of Science and Technology is one of the members of the International Science Council (ISC). It was founded in 1955 by merging the International Union of History of Science (IUHS) and the International Union of Philosophy of Science (IUPS), and consists of two divisions, the Division of History of Science and Technology (DHST) and the Division of Logic, Methodology and Philosophy of Science and Technology (DLMPST).

Structure and governance
The IUHPST does not have its own membership structure and governance, but is an umbrella organisation for its two Divisions, DHST and DLMPST. It is governed by the officers of the two Divisions in a
rotational system where the Presidency of the Union rotates between the Presidents of the two Divisions. 
The current IUHPST President is Nancy Cartwright (President of DLMPST), the current IUHPST Vice President is Marcos Cueto (President of DHST), the current IUHPST Secretary General is Benedikt Löwe (Secretary General of DLMPST), and the current IUHPST Treasurer is Pierre Édouard Bour (Treasurer of DLMPST).

DHST

The Division of History of Science and Technology (DHST) is an international non-governmental organisation devoted to international cooperation in the fields of history of science across the world. 
Together with the Division of Logic, Methodology, and Philosophy of Science and Technology (DLMPST), the DHST forms one of the two divisions of the International Union of History and Philosophy of Science and Technology, representing the field of history of science in the International Science Council (ISC). The DHST is a member organisation of the 
Conseil international de la philosophie et des sciences humaines (CIPSH).

The DHST organizes an international congress every four years, and coordinates the activities of numerous commissions. The members of DHST are 98 national members (represented by national committees for the history of science) and 26 international scientific unions.

Since the dawn of human civilization, philosophy and the humanities serve to enhance the understanding of goodness and truth, supporting the foundations for peace and the common good.

Past congresses

 1st International Congress of History of Science: Paris, France, 1929
 Second International Congress of the History of Science, 2nd International Congress of History of Science: London, England, 1931 See also
 3rd International Congress of History of Science: Porto-Combra-Lisbon, Portugal, 1934
 4th International Congress of History of Science: Prague, Czechoslovakia, 1937
 5th International Congress of History of Science: Lausanne, Switzerland, 1947
 6th International Congress of History of Science: Amsterdam, Netherlands, 1950
 7th International Congress of History of Science: Jerusalem, Israel, 1953
 8th International Congress of History of Science: Florence-Milan, Italy, 1956
 9th International Congress of History of Science: Barcelona-Madrid, Spain, 1959
 10th International Congress of History of Science: Ithaca, USA, 1962
 11th International Congress of History of Science: Cracow, Poland, 1965
 12th International Congress of History of Science: Paris, France, 1968
 13th International Congress of History of Science: Moscow, USSR, 1971
 14th International Congress of History of Science: Tokyo, Japan, 1974
 15th International Congress of History of Science: Edinburgh, Scotland, 1977
 16th International Congress of History of Science: Bucarest, Romania, 1981
 17th International Congress of History of Science: Berkeley, USA, 1985 See also
 18th International Congress of History of Science: Hamburg, Germany, 1989
 19th International Congress of History of Science: Zaragoza, Spain, 1993
 20th International Congress of History of Science: Liège, Belgium, 1997
 21st International Congress of History of Science: Mexico City, Mexico, 2001 See also
 22nd International Congress of History of Science: Beijing, China, 2005
 23rd International Congress of History of Science and Technology: Budapest, Hungary, 2009
 24th International Congress of History of Science, Technology and Medicine: Manchester, England, 2013
 25th Congress of History of Science and Technology: Rio de Janeiro, Brazil, 2017
 26th Congress of History of Science and Technology: Prague, Czech Republic, 2021

A map of past congresses can be found here.

Past and future presidents
 Charles Singer (1947-1950)
 George Sarton (1950-1953)
 Louis de Broglie (1953-1956)
 Robert Jacobus Forbes (1956-1959)
 Vasco Ronchi (1959-1968)
 I. Bernard Cohen (1969-1971)
 Joseph Needham (1972-1974)
 René Taton (1975-1977)
 Ashot Grigoryan (1978-1981)
 Erwin Hiebert (1982-1985)
 Paolo Galluzzi (1986-1989)
 William Shea (1990-1993)
 Robert Fox (1993-1997)
 Bidare Venk Subbarayappa (1997-2001)
 Ekmeleddin Ihsanoglu (2001-2005)
 Ronald Numbers (2005-2009)
 Liu Dun (2009-2013)
 Efthymios Nicolaidis (2013-2017)
 Michael Osborne (2017-2021)
 Marcos Cueto (2021-2025)

Current council 

The current (2017-2021) DHST council consists of 
Marcos Cueto (president),
Janet Brown (president elect),
Takehiko Hashimoto (first vice-president),
Hasok Chang (second vice-president),
Liesbeth De Mol (secretary general),
Milada Sekyrková (treasurer),
Thomas Hadded (assistant secretary general) and
the council members
Xingbo Luo,
,
Jahnavi Phalkey,
Maria Rentetzi,
Sergey Shalimov, and 
Hamish Spencer.

DLMPST

The Division of Logic, Methodology and Philosophy of Science and Technology (DLMPST) is an international non-governmental organisation devoted to international cooperation in the fields of logic and philosophy of science across the world. 
Together with the Division of History of Science and Technology (DHST), the DLMPST forms one of the two divisions of the International Union of History and Philosophy of Science and Technology, representing the fields of logic and philosophy of science in the International Science Council (ISC). 
The DLMPST is a member organisation of the 
Conseil international de la philosophie et des sciences humaines (CIPSH).
Until 2015, the DLMPST was called Division of Logic, Methodology and Philosophy of Science.

The main activity of the DLMPST is the organization of the Congress for Logic, Philosophy and Methodology of Science and Technology (CLMPST) every four years.

Past and planned congresses
 CLMPS I: Stanford CA, United States, 1960
 CLMPS II: Jerusalem, Israel, 1964
 CLMPS III: Amsterdam, Netherlands, 1967
 CLMPS IV: Bucharest, Romania, 1971
 CLMPS V: London ON, Canada, 1975
 CLMPS VI: Hannover, Germany, 1979
 CLMPS VII: Salzburg, Austria, 1983
 CLMPS VIII: Moscow, Soviet Union, 1987
 CLMPS IX: Uppsala, Sweden, 1991
 CLMPS X: Florence, Italy, 1995
 CLMPS XI: Cracow, Poland, 1999
 CLMPS XII: Oviedo, Spain, 2003
 CLMPS XIII: Beijing, China, 2007
 CLMPS XIV: Nancy, France, 2011
 CLMPS XV: Helsinki, Finland, 2015
 CLMPST XVI: Prague, Czech Republic, 2019
 CLMPST XVII: Buenos Aires, Argentina, 2023

Past and future presidents

Current DLMPST council
The council of the DLMPST consists of the executive committee and ten assessors.
The current members of the executive committee of the DLMPST are 
Nancy Cartwright (president),
Kim Sterelny (first vice president),
Verónica Becher (second vice president),
Benedikt Löwe (secretary general),
Pierre Édouard Bour (treasurer).
The assessors are
Hanne Andersen,
Rachel Ankeny,
Valeria de Paiva,
Gerhard Heinzmann,
Concha Martinez Vidal,
Tomáš Marvan,
Dhruv Raina,
Cheng Sumei,
Alasdair Urquhart, and
Andrés Villaveces.

Past DLMPST council members
In addition to the past presidents, past council members include

References.

External links

DHST website
DLMPST website

Members of the International Council for Science
International scientific organizations
Philosophy of science
Philosophy organizations
Organizations established in 1955
Members of the International Science Council